The Picture may refer to:

 The Picture (Massinger play), a 1630 play by Philip Massinger
 The Picture (Ionesco play), a 1955 play by Eugène Ionesco
 The Picture (magazine), an Australian weekly men's magazine
 "The Picture" (story), a short story by Erskine Caldwell, included in the 1933 collection We Are the Living
 The Pictures, an Australian alternative rock band
 "The Picture", a song by Editors from the CD single Smokers Outside the Hospital Doors

See also
 
 Picture (disambiguation)
 Get the Picture (disambiguation)